Sandro Costa da Silva (born February 13, 1987 in São Paulo), or simply Sandro, is a Brazilian attacking midfielder. He currently plays for Figueirense.

Contract
14 May 2007 to 31 December 2009

External links
CBF  

1987 births
Living people
Brazilian footballers
Grêmio Foot-Ball Porto Alegrense players
Sport Club Corinthians Paulista players
Figueirense FC players
Association football midfielders
Footballers from São Paulo